Stephanie Ann McCaffrey (born February 18, 1993) is an American former soccer player who played as a forward. During her career, she made six appearances for the United States women's national team.

Early career
McCaffrey attended Buckingham Browne & Nichols where she played for the soccer team. In 2008 and 2010, she was named the Independent School League Most Valuable Player and Boston Globe All-Scholastic. After missing the 2009 season due to an injury, she led the school to the league championship in 2010 and broke the league's scoring record in a single season with 38 goals and 7 assists. McCaffrey played club soccer for the FC Stars of Massachusetts and led the team to clinch the state championship and a spot in the national finals in 2010.

College career: Boston College Eagles (2011–2014)
McCaffrey attended Boston College and played for the Eagles from 2011 to 2014 in the Atlantic Coast Conference (ACC). During her freshman season, she played in every game for a total of 776 minutes and scored her first goal (a game-winner) against Rutgers University to lead the Eagles to a 1–0 win. During her sophomore season, she started in 20 of the 21 games she played and was ranked second on the team for goals scored with 10 including three game-winning goals. She served seven assists ending the season with 27 points. On October 23, 2012, she was named ACC Co-Player of the Week along with Caroline Miller of the University of Virginia for being directly involved in two of Boston's three goals during the week, which included a 3–2 upset of the number one and undefeated Florida State University. 

As a junior, McCaffrey started in all 24 games. Her 12 goals ranked second on the team in scoring and nine assists ranked first  in assists. She tied the team's record for points scored in a single game with eight (two goals, four assists) during a match against Hofstra University on September 1, 2013. McCaffrey was named to the All-ACC Academic Team and received the Athletic Director's Award for Academic Achievement. As a senior in 2014, she co-captained the team and finished the season as the second-leading scorer on the team with six goals. Her seven assists ranked first on the team. McCaffrey finished her collegiate career with 32 goals ranking fifth in the history of the team and was twice named to the All-Atlantic Coast Conference First Team.

Club career

Boston Breakers (2015–2016)
McCaffrey was selected fifth overall by the Chicago Red Stars of the 2015 NWSL College Draft and was traded to the Boston Breakers during the second round. In her rookie season McCaffrey started 17 games and scored 3 goals. She returned to the club in 2016 and she appeared in 12 games before she was traded to the Chicago Red Stars.

Chicago Red Stars (2016–2018)
McCaffrey was traded to the Chicago Red Stars on July 22, 2016 in exchange for four draft picks in the 2017 NWSL College Draft and an international roster spot. She made her first appearance for the Red Stars on July 23 against the Houston Dash as a substitute in the 85th minute. McCaffrey scored 2 goals in 2016, helping the Red Stars qualify for the 2016 NWSL Playoffs. Due to a neurological illness McCaffrey only played in 2 games for the Red Stars in 2018.

On March 3, 2019 McCaffrey announced that she would be unable to continue playing professional soccer due to her illness.

International career
McCaffrey represented the United States on the United States under-23 national team from 2014 to 2015. In February 2015, she played with the team at the La Manga Tournament. In January 2015, she was called up to train with the senior national team. She earned her first senior cap against Brazil on October 25, 2015 and also scored her first international goal in her first cap.

McCaffrey was named to the 20-player roster for the 2016 CONCACAF Women's Olympic Qualifying Championship. The United States qualified for the 2016 Summer Olympics, but McCaffrey wasn't named to the Olympic Team.

Personal life
McCaffrey was born on February 18, 1993, in Boston to Gina and Jim McCaffrey, though she was raised in Winchester, Massachusetts. Her father was a sixth round selection of the Phoenix Suns in the 1986 NBA Draft, her mother ran track, and two of her brothers played Division 1 college football. She is currently in a relationship with artist Erin Robertson and over the course of 2021 and 2022 began to be more open about her life, including coming out as gay.

Career statistics

International goals

Honors

International
 CONCACAF Women's Olympic Qualifying Tournament: 2016

References

Match reports

External links

 U.S. Soccer player profile
 Boston Breakers player profile
 Boston College player profile
 

Living people
1993 births
American women's soccer players
Boston College Eagles women's soccer players
Boston Breakers players
National Women's Soccer League players
Women's association football forwards
Buckingham Browne & Nichols School alumni
United States women's international soccer players
Chicago Red Stars players
Chicago Red Stars draft picks
Soccer players from Massachusetts
People from Winchester, Massachusetts
Sportspeople from Middlesex County, Massachusetts